Anthony Peter David Friedlander  (born 12 November 1944) is a former New Zealand politician of the National Party. After politics, he worked as a lobbyist for the Road Transport Forum (RTF).

Early life
Friedlander was born in 1944 at Wanganui. His father was Morris Friedlander, who was an important organisational figure for the National Party. Tony Friedlander received his education at Lincoln College, from where he graduated with Dip Ag (diploma in agriculture), with a Dip VFM (diploma in valuation and farm management). He is an Associate of the New Zealand Institute of Valuers. He was a farm appraiser for the State Advances Corporation in 1968 and 1969, a farm economist for the Poultrymen's Co-op in 1970, and then a farm appraiser for the Rural Banking & Finance Corporation from 1971 to 1975.

Political career

He represented the electorate until 1987, when he was defeated by Labour's Harry Duynhoven. From December 1981 to June 1982, he was parliamentary under-secretary to the Minister of Energy, the Minister of National Development, and the Minister of Regional Development (Bill Birch in all cases). From June 1982 to July 1984, he was Minister of Works and Development, and Minister of Housing.

Post politics
Friedlander held various management positions with Fletcher Challenge between 1987 and 1993. He was appointed chief executive officer at the NZ Road Transport Association in 1993 and held that position for four years, to then become the inaugural chief executive officer of the newly established Road Transport Forum (RTF), which represents trucking companies and lobbies for road transport in New Zealand.  Friedlander retired from that role in 2010 and was succeeded by Ken Shirley.

In the 1994 New Year Honours, Friedlander was appointed a Companion of the Queen's Service Order for public services.

Notes

References

1944 births
Living people
New Zealand National Party MPs
Members of the Cabinet of New Zealand
Ministers of Housing (New Zealand)
Companions of the Queen's Service Order
New Zealand MPs for North Island electorates
Unsuccessful candidates in the 1987 New Zealand general election
Members of the New Zealand House of Representatives
Lincoln University (New Zealand) alumni
People from Whanganui